William Shore (1846 – October 24, 1910) was an Ontario farmer and political figure. He represented Middlesex East in the Legislative Assembly of Ontario from 1894 to 1898 as a Liberal-Protestant Protective Association member.

He was born in Westminster Township, Canada West in 1846, the son of John Shore, who came to Upper Canada from England. He died October 24, 1910.

References

External links

The Canadian parliamentary companion, 1897 JA Gemmill

1846 births
1910 deaths
Ontario Liberal Party MPPs
Protestant Protective Association MPPs